Ideophone is a word class evoking ideas in sound imitation or onomatopoeia to express action, manner of property. Ideophone is the least common syntactic category cross-linguistically occurring mostly in African, Australian and Amerindian languages, and sporadically elsewhere. It is globally the only known word class exotic to English. Ideophones resemble interjections but are unclassifiable as such owing to their special phonetic or derivational characteristics, and based on their syntactic function within the sentence. They may include sounds that deviate from the language's phonological system, imitating—often in a repetitive manner—sounds of movement, animal noises, bodily sounds, noises made by tools or machines, and the like. 

While English does have ideophonic or onomatopoetic expressions, it does not contain a proper class of ideophones because any English onomatopoeic word can be included in one of the classical categories. For example, la-di-da functions as an adjective while others, such as zigzag, may function as a verb, adverb or adjective, depending on the clausal context. In the sentence 'The rabbit zigzagged across the meadow", the verb zigzag takes the past –ed verb ending. In contrast, the reconstructed example *"The rabbit zigzag zigzag across the meadow" emulates an ideophone but is not idiomatic to English.

Dictionaries of languages like Japanese, Korean, Xhosa, Yoruba, and Zulu list thousands of ideophones. Sometimes ideophones are called phonosemantic to indicate that it is not a grammatical word class in the traditional sense of the word (like verb or noun), but rather a lexical class based on the special relationship between form and meaning exhibited by ideophones. In the discipline of linguistics, ideophones have sometimes been overlooked or treated as a subgroup of interjections.

Characteristics

The word ideophone was coined in 1935 by Clement Martyn Doke, who defined it in his Bantu Linguistic Terminology as follows.

Ideophones evoke sensory events. A well known instance of ideophones are onomatopoeic words—words that imitate the sound (of the event) they refer to. Some ideophones may be derived from onomatopoeic notions. In many languages, however, ideophones do not solely represent sound. For instance, in Gbaya, kpuk '''a rap on the door' may be onomatopoeic, but other ideophones depict motion and visual scenes: loɓoto-loɓoto 'large animals plodding through mud', kiláŋ-kiláŋ 'in a zigzagging motion', pɛɗɛŋ-pɛɗɛŋ 'razor sharp'.

Ideophones are often characterized as iconic or sound-symbolic words, meaning that there can be a resemblance between their form and their meaning. For instance, in West-African languages, voiced consonants and low tone in ideophones are often connected to largeness and heaviness, whereas voiceless consonants and high tones tend to relate to smallness and lightness. Reduplication figures quite prominently in ideophones, often conveying a sense of repetition or plurality present in the evoked event. The iconicity of ideophones is shown by the fact that people can guess the meanings of ideophones from various languages at a level above chance. However, the form of ideophones does not completely relate to their meaning; as conventionalized words, they contain arbitrary, language-specific phonemes just like other parts of the vocabulary.

Grammar
The grammatical function of ideophones varies by language. In some languages (e.g. Welayta, Yir-Yiront, Semai, Korean), they form a separate word class, while in others, they occur across a number of different word classes (e.g. Mundang, Ewe, Sotho, Hausa).

Despite this diversity, ideophones show a number of robust regularities across languages. One is that they are often marked in the same way as quoted speech and demonstrations. Sometimes ideophones can form a complete utterance on their own, as in English "ta-da!" or Japanese . However, in such cases the word ideophone is used as a synonym to interjection. Proper ideophones may occur within utterances, depicting a scene described by other elements of the utterance, as in Japanese Taro wa sutasuta to haya-aruki o shita "Taro walked hurriedly' (literally 'Taro did haste-walk sutasuta'). Ideophones are more like illustrations of events than responses to events. An ideophone like Gbaya kiláŋ-kiláŋ 'in a zigzagging motion' displays a certain resemblance to the event (for instance, its irregular vowels and tones depicting the irregularity of the motion).

Registers
Languages may differ in the context in which ideophones are used. In some languages, ideophones are primarily used in spoken language (e.g. narrative contexts) and are rarely encountered in written language. In other languages (e.g. Ewe, Japanese), ideophones can be freely used in all registers. In general, however, ideophones tend to occur more extensively in spoken language because of their expressive or dramaturgic function.

Examples

Japanese

The Japanese language has thousands of ideophones, often called mimetics. The constructions are quite metrical 2-2, or 3-3, where morae play a role in the symmetry. The first consonant of the second word of the reduplication may become voiced if phonological conditions allow. Japanese ideophones are used extensively in daily conversations as well as in the written language.

 doki doki – heart-pounding
 kira kira – glittery
 shiin – silence
 niko niko – smile
 jii – starerun run – cheerful

Tamil
The Tamil language uses a lot of ideophones, both in spoken (colloquial) and in formal usage. Ideophones are called irattaik kilavi (இரட்டைக் கிளவி) in Tamil grammar.

 sora sora – rough (the sound produced when rubbing back and forth on a rough surface)
 vazha-vazha – smooth, slippery
 mozhu-mozhu – smooth (surface)
 kozhu-kozhu – plump
 kozha-kozha – slimy, gooey
 busu-busu – soft and bushy
 giDu-giDu – quickly, fast
 maDa-maDa – quickly, fast
 masa-masa – sluggish, lethargic
 viru-viru – energetically (also, spicy)
 choda-choda – marshy, waterlogged
 paLa-paLa – glittering, shiny
 veDa-veDa – shaking, trembling
 chuDa-chuDa – piping hot
 mAngu-mAngu – laboriously
 gara-gara – crunchy, gravely (as in voice)
 doLa-doLa - hanging loose (as in loose fitting)
 taLa-taLa - lush (as in a lush plant/orchard)
 toNa-toNa - annoyingly incessant

Xhosa

In Xhosa, as in closely related Zulu, ideophones can convey very complex experiential impressions or can just strengthen meanings of other words. The ideophone is often introduced using the verb thi 'say'.

Using thi:

 cwaka – to be silent
 Lixesha lokuthi cwaka. 'It is time to be silent.' [literally: 'It is time to say cwaka.']
 gqi – to suddenly appear
 Bathi gqi abelungu eAfrika. 'The white people suddenly arrived in Africa.' [Literally: 'The white people said gqi in Africa.'])

Without using thi:

 ncam – exact

 bhuxe – to stand motionless

 Further reading 

Dingemanse, M. (2011). Ezra Pound among the Mawu: Ideophones and Iconicity in Siwu. In P. Michelucci, O. Fischer, & C. Ljungberg (Eds.), Semblance and Signification (pp. 39–54). John Benjamins.

Dingemanse, M. (2011). The Meaning and Use of Ideophones in Siwu [PhD dissertation, Radboud University].

Dingemanse, M. (2012). Advances in the cross-linguistic study of ideophones. Language and Linguistics Compass, 6(10), 654–672. doi: 10.1002/lnc3.361

Dingemanse, M., Schuerman, W., Reinisch, E., Tufvesson, S., & Mitterer, H. (2016). What sound symbolism can and cannot do: testing the iconicity of ideophones from five languages. Language, 92(2), e117–e133. doi: 10.1353/lan.2016.0034

Dingemanse, M. (2023). Ideophones. In E. van Lier (Ed.), The Oxford Handbook of Word Classes. Oxford University Press.

Howard, A. W. H. (2021). Sound Symbolism in the Turkish Tongue [MA thesis, Radboud University].

Nuckolls, J. B. (2001). Ideophones in pastaza quechua. Typological Studies in Language, 44, 271-286.

Nuckolls, J. B. (2003). To be or not to be ideophonically impoverished. Symposium about Language and Society.

Voeltz, F. K. E., and C. Kilian-Hatz (eds.) 2001. Ideophones''. Amsterdam / Philadelphia: John Benjamins.

See also
Ideasthesia
Sound symbolism (phonosemantics)
Synesthesia
Reduplication
Onomatopoeia
Japanese sound symbolism
Bouba/kiki effect

References

Bibliography

 
 
 
 
 
 
 
 
 
 

Phonaesthetics
Semantics
Semiotics
Parts of speech